{{Infobox writer
|image        = JCW.png
|caption      = Corey Whaley at a book signing event|birth_date   = 
|birth_place  = Springhill, Louisiana, USA
|occupation   = Writer
| period        = 2010–present
| notableworks  = Where Things Come BackNOGGIN Highly Illogical Behavior| awards        =  William C. Morris Award National Book Award Finalist 
}}

John Corey Whaley (born January 19, 1984) is an American author of contemporary realistic novels for young adults. His debut, Where Things Come Back, was published by Atheneum Books in 2011 and Whaley won the Printz Award from the American Library Association in 2012, recognizing it as the year's "best book written for teens, based entirely on its literary merit." In 2011 the National Book Foundation named him a 5 under 35 honoree. His second novel, Noggin, was a finalist for the 2014 National Book Award for Young People's Literature.

Early life
Whaley was born on January 19, 1984. He grew up in Springhill, Louisiana and graduated from Springhill High School in 2002. He then moved to Ruston, Louisiana, to attend college. After college, he taught public middle and high school English for five years in Louisiana before becoming a full-time author.

 Education 
Whaley holds a B.A. in English and an M.A.T. in Secondary English Education from Louisiana Tech University in Ruston, Louisiana.

Works

Where Things Come Back
Just when seventeen-year-old Cullen Witter thinks he understands everything about his small and painfully dull Arkansas town, his knowledge all disappears.

In the summer before Cullen's senior year, a nominally depressed birdwatcher named John Barling tries to validate the spotting of a woodpecker species thought to be extinct since the 1940s in Cullen's hometown of Lily, Arkansas. His attempts to find the so-called Lazarus woodpecker bring a flurry of press and woodpecker experts from all over the U.S to the previously tame and static town. However, the townspeople of Lily hope that the woodpecker that was brought back to life will put some life back into their town. All the kids start getting woodpecker haircuts, everyone eats the new Lazarus burgers, and everyone shares their cheer about the woodpecker, everyone except for Cullen, that is. Cullen sees the town's preoccupation with the Lazarus woodpecker as an absurd carnival with John Barling as the carnival's crazy ringmaster. Nothing is more startling though for Cullen and the people of Lily, Arkansas than the realization that Cullen's sensitive, gifted 15-year-old brother Gabriel has suddenly and inexplicably disappeared.

While Cullen navigates his way through a summer of finding and losing love, holding his fragile family together, and muddling his way into adulthood, a young missionary in Africa, who has lost his faith, searches for any semblance of meaning wherever he can find it. As distant as the two stories seem at the start, they are thoughtfully woven ever closer together and through masterful plotting, brought face to face in a surprising and harrowing climax.

Complex but truly extraordinary, tinged with melancholy and regret, comedy and absurdity, this novel finds wonder in the ordinary and emerges as ultimately hopeful. It's about a lot more than what Cullen calls "that damn bird." It's about the dream of second chances and things coming back.

Noggin
Travis Coates was alive once and then he wasn't.

Now he's alive again. 
Simple as that.

The in between part is still a little fuzzy, but he can tell you that, at some point or another, his head got chopped off and shoved into a freezer in Denver, Colorado. Five years later, it was reattached to some other guy's body, and well, here he is. Despite all logic, he's still 16 and everything and everyone around him has changed. That includes his bedroom, his parents, his best friend, and his girlfriend. Or maybe she's not his girlfriend anymore? That's a bit fuzzy too.

Looks like if the new Travis and the old Travis are ever going to find a way to exist together, then there are going to be a few more scars.

Oh, well, you only live twice.

Highly Illogical Behavior

Sixteen-year-old Solomon Reed is agoraphobic. He hasn't left the house in three years, two months, and one day, which is fine by him. Seventeen-year-old Lisa Praytor has her sights set on the second-best psychology program in the country (she's being realistic). But is ambition alone enough to get her in? Enter Solomon. Determined to "fix" Sol, Lisa steps into his world, along with her charming boyfriend Clark, and soon enough the three form an unexpected bond. But, as Lisa learns more about Sol and he and Clark grow closer and closer, the walls they've built around themselves start to collapse and their friendships threaten to do the same.

Awards and recognition
The U.S. Young Adult Library Services Association recognized Where Things Come Back with the annual Printz Award that is open to all books published in the U.S. for young-adult readers. Naturally Whaley also won YALSA's award for new authors (debut books), the 2012 William C. Morris YA Award.Where Things Come Back was chosen as a Publishers Weekly Best Book 2011.
Whaley was selected by the National Book Foundation as a Top 5 Under 35 Author for 2011.
Whaley and Where Things Come Back are included on ABC Children's Group's New Voices 2011 Top Ten List for Teens.
Whaley was named a Spring 2011 Flying Start Author by Publishers Weekly for his debut novel, Where Things Come Back, which also received a starred review from the publication.
SIBA, the Southern Independent Booksellers Alliance, named Where Things Come Back as one of its Spring 2011 Okra Picks.
In 2008, Whaley was also a semi-finalist for the 1st. Annual Amazon.com Breakthrough Novel Award.
2014 California Book Awards Young Adult Finalist for "Noggin" 
2014 National Book Awards NOGGIN'' was a finalist for the National Book Award for Young People's Literature.

References

External links
 
 

American children's writers
Louisiana Tech University alumni
Michael L. Printz Award winners
Novelists from Louisiana
Living people
1984 births
American gay writers
American male novelists
American LGBT novelists
21st-century American novelists
21st-century American male writers
The William C. Morris YA Debut Award winners